

Notes and references

surnames E to G